Acanthocidaris hastigera is a species of sea urchin of the family Cidaridae. Their armour is covered with spines. It is in the genus Acanthocidaris and lives in the sea. Acanthocidaris hastingeria was first scientifically described in 1907 by Alexander Emanuel Agassiz & Hubert Lyman Clark.

References

Animals described in 1907
Cidaridae
Taxa named by Alexander Agassiz
Taxa named by Hubert Lyman Clark